The 1916 Detroit Heralds season was the 12th season for the Detroit Heralds, an independent American football team. Led by coach Bill Marshall, the team compiled a 6–4 record.

Schedule

Players
 Vernon Castle - fullback
 Collins - tackle
 Cornwall - guard
 Pat Dunne - fullback/halfback
 Edgerton - tackle
 Gardener - end
 Norm "Tango" Glockson - guard/end
 Lambert - quarterback
 Latham - quarterback 
 "Nig" Lenahan - halfback
 Birtie Maher - end/halfback 
 Blake Miller - end
 Mitchell - guard
 Danny Mullane - end/halfback
 Nowashe - guard
 Ruben - end
 Norb Sacksteder - halfback
 H. Schlee - tackle/guard
 Schultz - end/halfback/fullback/tackle
 G. Shields - tackle
 R. "Dick" Shields - quarterback/end and captain
 Archie "Dutch" Stewart - center
 Strait - guard
 Tucker - halfback
 Perce Wilson - halfback/quarterback

References 

Detroit Heralds seasons
Detroit Heralds